General elections were held in Sierra Leone on 7 March 2018 to elect the President, Parliament and local councils. Incumbent President Ernest Bai Koroma did not run for another term, as he was constitutionally ineligible, having served the maximum ten years in office.

No presidential candidate received the 55% of the vote required to win in the first round, meaning a second round of voting was held on 31 March between the top two candidates, opposition leader Julius Maada Bio of the Sierra Leone People's Party and Samura Kamara of the ruling All People's Congress; the two were separated by under 15,000 votes in the first round. Bio was subsequently elected with 51.8% of the vote.  International observers hailed the election as being "orderly, free and fair" despite the fact it was "hotly contested."

Electoral system
The President of Sierra Leone is elected using a modified two-round system, with a candidate having to receive more than 55% of the vote in the first round to be elected. If this is not achieved, a run-off will be held.

The 132 elected members of Parliament (increased from 112 in the 2012 elections) were elected from single-member constituencies by first-past-the-post voting. The remaining 14 seats are reserved for Paramount Chiefs, who are elected indirectly.

Presidential candidates
A total of 16 candidates registered to contest the elections; 14 men and two women.

President Koroma personally selected foreign minister Samura Kamara as the All People's Congress candidate at the party's convention held on 15 November 2017 in the northern city of Makeni. The APC also selected deputy speaker of parliament Chernor Maju Bah as the party's vice presidential candidate.

The main opposition, the Sierra Leone People's Party (SLPP) selected former military Head of State, retired Brigadier general Julius Maada Bio as its presidential candidate at the party's national convention held on 15 November 2017 in Freetown. Bio's running mate is businessman Mohamed Juldeh Jalloh.

Former Vice President Samuel Sam-Sumana is the candidate of the Coalition for Change. His removal from office by President Koroma was challenged at the ECOWAS Court, which in November 2017 ruled that the removal of Sumana was illegal.

Former United Nations senior official Kandeh Yumkella was chosen to be the presidential candidate of the National Grand Coalition (NGC), a breakaway faction of the SLPP. Yumkella's running mate is mechanical engineer Andrew Keillie.

The newly formed Unity Party is fielding Femi Claudius Cole, one of two female presidential candidates.

Former Minister of Internal Affairs and Minister of Lands Musa Tarawally was nominated as the presidential candidate of the Citizens Democratic Party.

Controversy
Due to the fact that the election falls outside of the five-year term plus three months limit, constitutional lawyers have criticised the announcement.

Dual citizenship 
The previously dormant issue of dual citizenship was raised during the election. The ruling party, APC, raised the issue citing Section 76(1) of the 1991 Constitution, which states that “No person shall be qualified for election as a Member of Parliament — if he is a naturalised citizen of Sierra Leone or is a citizen of a country other than Sierra Leone having become such a citizen voluntarily or is under a declaration of allegiance to such a country.” The dual citizenship debate engulfed three presidential candidates: Kandeh Kolleh Yumkella of the National Grand Coalition (NGC), Dr. Samura Kamara of the All People's Congress (APC), and Mohamed Kamarainba Mansaray of the Alliance Democratic Party (ADP). Yumkella claimed he denounced his American citizenship in 2017, while Mansaray said he has never held any other citizenship. Two cases were brought to the Supreme Court: one filed on 5 February by an activist of the ruling All Peoples Congress party claiming that Yumkella is a naturalised citizen and therefore unqualified to contest the elections; and another filed by Charles Margai, a flag bearer for People's Movement for Democratic Change (PMDC), claiming that the APC’s standard bearer is unqualified to run for president because he is a dual citizen and did not resign his ministerial position – for which he was paid from the state’s consolidated revenue – long enough to meet the constitutional requirement. The defense of Yumkella appealed to the Supreme Court to have two of the judges removed from the case, then the matter was adjourned until 28 March (after the 7 March election) for the two new judges to study the case. The dual citizenship issue will be remembered by citizens for propagating the slang term two-SIM to describe a person with dual citizenship.

Results
The National Electoral Commission reported 3,178,663 registered voters (of which 1,654,228 were female) and a voter turnout of 2,676,549 (84.2%) across 3,300 polling centres and 11,122 polling stations.

President

By district

Parliament
A total of 795 candidates contested the parliamentary elections, of which 100 were female.

References

Sierra Leone
2018 in Sierra Leone
2018
2018
2018
March 2018 events in Africa